Shangguan is a Chinese compound surname. 

Zilan's descendants took the place name as their surname. Following Qin's wars of unification, the Shangguan family and others loyal to the state of Chu were forced to relocate. The surname is prominent in Gansu, around Tianshui. A second wave of migration after the Tang dynasty ended saw many members of the Shangguan family settle in Fujian.

Shangguan is listed 411th in the Hundred Family Surnames.

Notable people with the surname include:
Grand Empress Dowager Shangguan (88–37 BC; personal name unknown), granddaughter of Shangguan Jie, wife of Emperor Zhao of Han 
Shangguan Jie (died 80 BC), Chinese official, grandfather of Grand Empress Dowager Shangguan
Shangguan Jiqing (born 1963), Chinese politician
Polly Shang-Kuan Ling-Feng (born 1949), Taiwanese actress
Shangguan Wan'er (664–710), Chinese politician and poet, granddaughter of Shangguan Yi
Shangguan Yi (608–665), Chinese poet and politician, grandfather of Shangguan Wan'er
Shangguan Yunzhu (1920–1968; stage name), Chinese actress

References

Chu (state)
Chinese-language surnames
Individual Chinese surnames